The Upper Darling Range Railway (also known as the Upper Darling Range Branch) was a branch railway from Midland Junction, Western Australia, that rose up the southern side of the Helena Valley and on to the Darling Scarp via the Kalamunda Zig Zag. At the time of construction it was the only section of railway in Western Australia to have had a zig zag formation.

History
Completed in July 1891, the Upper Darling Range Railway line was built by the Canning Jarrah Timber Company to supply railway sleepers to Perth's growing railway system. It ran from Midland Junction railway station through to the Darling Ranges and up into Kalamunda. It was later extended to Canning Mills and in 1912 to Karragullen. From Pickering Brook, a line branched off to Bartons Mill.

On 1 July 1903, the line was taken over by the Western Australian Government Railways and became known as the Upper Darling Range Branch. The last service ran on 22 July 1949. The line was formally closed by the Railways (Upper Darling Range) Discontinuance Act 1950; it was dismantled in 1952.

Stopping places

Named stopping places and locations on the line included:

References

Further reading
Gunzburg, Adrian (1967) Upper Darling Range Railway: WAGR held at Battye Library
Price, Eric T. (1983) The Canning jarrah line, 1891–1903 Western Australia : E.T. Price
Slee, John. (1979) Cala Munnda : a home in the forest : a history of Kalamunda Kalamunda, W.A. : Shire of Kalamunda. 
Steele, Ken.(1993) Zig Zag to Kalamunda : the story of the Upper Darling Range Railway Lesmurdie, W.A.: Drillmark Publications Division. 
Watson, Lindsay (1995)The Railway History of Midland Junction : Commemorating The Centenary of Midland Junction, 1895–1995 Swan View, W.A : L & S Drafting in association with the Shire of Swan and the Western Australian Light Railway Preservation Association.
Webb, E.G. (Eric Godfrey) & Kalamunda and Districts Historical Society (1996).  Rails in the hills : a history of the railway from Midland to Karragullen, 1891–1949 Kalamund & Districts Historical Society, Kalamunda, W.A

External links
Kev's Workshop Kalamunda Zig-Zag Page

Bickley, Western Australia
Closed railway lines in Western Australia
Kalamunda, Western Australia
Midland, Western Australia
Railway lines opened in 1891
Railway lines closed in 1949